Erythrolamprus taeniogaster is a species of snake in the family Colubridae. The species is found in Brazil, Colombia, Venezuela, Suriname, French Guiana, Peru, and Bolivia.

References

Erythrolamprus
Reptiles of Brazil
Reptiles of Bolivia
Reptiles described in 1863
Taxa named by Giorgio Jan